Second-in-Command Harshpal Singh, KC, PMG & two bars, JPM, is a Central Reserve Police Force (CRPF) Officer. He joined the CRPF in 2004. He received the Kirti Chakra, India's second highest peacetime gallantry medal, on 15 August 2019 (73rd Independence Day), for eliminating three terrorists despite being injured.

In 2014, he assassinated a Naxal with a  bounty on his head in Chhattisgarh's Khunti district. He was awarded the Police Medal (Gallantry) in 2015 for killing the Naxal Zonal Commander in Khunti. Again, in the same year, he received the Police medal from Jharkhand's Chief Minister.

References 

Indian police officers
Recipients of the Kirti Chakra
1981 births
Living people